Timothy Napier Moxon (2 June 1924 – 5 December 2006) was an English-born actor, pilot and restaurateur who is probably best known for playing John Strangways, the character who uttered the first dialogue in the first James Bond film Dr. No, and was the first character to die in the film series.

Timothy Moxon is mentioned and quoted in British historian Matthew Parker's Random House 2014 book: Goldeneye: Where James Bond Was Born: Ian Fleming's Jamaica.

Timothy Moxon was interviewed in 2005 in Jamaica by Lee Pfeiffer, editor-in-chief of Cinema Retro magazine for the Movie Classics special edition of The First James Bond Film  – Dr. No. (pages 28 – 29).

Early life and career
Moxon was born in Kent, England and served in the Royal Air Force in the Second World War, training as a pilot in Canada, and flying aircraft that towed troop-carrying gliders across occupied Europe. After the war he acted in repertory theatre and, with his brother Oliver Moxon, founded the New Torch Theatre, London. He was also a pilot with BEA, and for an agricultural crop spraying company in Sudan and Jamaica, where he remained for the rest of his life, settling in Oracabessa.
Tim also was a pilot for Reynolds Metals Co. in British Guiana (now Guyana ) during the early 1960s, flying in and out of Kwakwani, while also living there.

Dr. No
Moxon was working as a crop dusting pilot when he had a chance meeting at the Courtleigh Manor Hotel in Kingston, Jamaica, with the director Terence Young, who remembered him as an actor on the London stage. Young offered him a small role at the start of the film, as a British agent who leaves a card game to take a phone call, and is murdered by three assassins posing as blind men. It transpires that the character was killed, because he was investigating the activities of the villainous Dr. No, and revealed this to his friend Professor Dent, who was secretly working for No.

In 1967, he had a role in another film shot in the Caribbean entitled Come Spy With Me, and in his later years he appeared in local theatre productions, in a documentary film entitled Inside Dr. No and at James Bond fan events where he signed autographs.

Later life
He founded the Jamaican charter airline TimAir, and ran a hot air balloon business for tourists. He opened the popular HouseBoat Fondue Restaurant in Montego Bay, and performed in many plays with his partner Norma at Montego Bay theatre. He died aged 82 in 2006, leaving a son and two daughters.
Timothy Moxon did NOT run or own a hot air balloon business. He was a pilot for the Hilton High Day Tour Ltd. For a short period of about 3 months.
Timothy Moxon DID NOT  open or own  The Houseboat Restaurant in Montego Bay.  He managed the restaurant as a fondue restaurant for approximately  one year.  The Houseboat and the Hilton High Day Tour were owned solely by Norma Stanley who was only a friend of Timothy Moxon.  This  incorrect information was supplied by a family members?

Filmography

References

External links
 

1924 births
2006 deaths
English male film actors
English aviators
British restaurateurs
British expatriates in Jamaica
Royal Air Force pilots of World War II
Male actors from Kent
British World War II bomber pilots
British expatriates in Sudan
British expatriates in Guyana